Terrible Terry McGovern (March 9, 1880 – February 22, 1918) was an American professional boxer who held the World Bantamweight and Featherweight Championships. He was born in Johnstown, Pennsylvania as John Terrence McGovern. Through most of his career he was managed by Sam H. Harris, who remained a lifelong friend. Many boxing historians considered McGovern's greatest attributes his punching ability and signature charges rather than his boxing style or defensive technique.  That the majority of his wins were by knockout speaks to the power of his punch.

Early life
McGovern was born in Johnstown, Pennsylvania on March 9, 1880, to Irish parents. After the death of his father Joseph, he tried to help support his widowed mother by peddling vegetables after the family moved to South Brooklyn the year after he was born. Starting his professional career in 1897, several of his brothers would also attempt to make a living as boxers.

He began boxing at Brooklyn's Greenwood Athletic Club in preliminary bouts at age 16.

Professional career 
In his impressive career, McGovern took both the World Bantamweight and Featherweight Titles. He defended the World Featherweight Title at least five times against Joe Bernstein, Tommy White, Aurelio Herrera, and twice against Oscar Gardiner. He lost it to Young Corbett II who defeated him in World Featherweight Title fights on two separate occasions. His victory over Frank Erne, World Lightweight Champion, led some to claim he was also heir to the World Lightweight Title, though most sources today believe the bout was not a sanctioned title fight.

In his first 36 better-publicized bouts before taking the World Bantamweight Title, McGovern won an astounding 30, losing only to Johnny Snee and Tim Calahan. His winning streak did not end after taking the Bantamweight Title.

World Bantam Champ, 1899

McGovern won the vacant World Bantamweight Championship on September 12, 1899, in a first-round knockout of British boxer Pedlar Palmer before a crowd of 10,000, using a series of heavy body blows. McGovern was only 19 years old and had been boxing professionally little more than two years. The bout took place at the Westchester Athletic Club in New York. The winner was to receive $7,500, and the loser $2,500, both sizable purses for the period, but far less than boxers would make for a World Title fight a decade later. The referee was George Siler. The fight was billed as the 116 pound championship. McGovern wore green trunks for the bout which he believed gave him luck. This was the first world championship bout under Queensberry Rules to end by a one-round knockout. McGovern never defended the title and relinquished it in 1900.

On November 18, 1899, he defeated New Yorker Patsy Haley in a first-round knockout in Chicago at Tattersall's in a non-title match. Like many of McGovern's early opponents, Haley was a skilled boxer, yet not a match for McGovern. Haley would become one of the best-known and most-respected New York-area referees in the 1920s and 1930s and referee an impressive array of World Title fights.

Win over Frank Erne, Lightweight Champion
On July 16, 1900, in an important bout, McGovern defeated World Lightweight Champion Frank Erne in a third-round technical knockout before a crowd of 13,000 in New York's Madison Square Garden. Erne knocked down McGovern with a blow to the head in the very first round, but McGovern took most of the count before landing on his feet and resuming the fight. Grinning and furious, McGovern was fastest in the third round showing his signature aggressive style.  Erne, was down at least twice in the third round and had received a telling blow to the face from McGovern before his seconds threw in the sponge. Upon examination after the fight, Erne was found to have the most substantial injuries to his nose and mouth. The betting on the fight remained even for a considerable time, before McGovern took a slight lead before the fight.  As Erne was the reigning World Lightweight Champion as a result of just beating Joe Gans, some sources credited McGovern with having taken the World Lightweight Crown as a result of winning the match by a TKO, but very few give him credit for the title today.

On December 22, 1899, McGovern defeated Harry Forbes in what was billed by some sources as a World Featherweight match, but the bout was not widely recognized as one. McGovern knocked out Forbes in the second round at the New Broadway Athletic Club. Forbes went down after a terrific right-handed uppercut to the chin from McGovern, who was the aggressor throughout the short match. McGovern had beaten Forbes earlier in a 15th-round knockout in Brooklyn on October 1, 1898.

World Featherweight Champ, 1900

McGovern moved up in weight from Bantam and captured the World Featherweight Championship from George Dixon on January 9, 1900, by scoring a technical knockout in the eighth round at the Broadway Athletic Club in New York.  Dixon was not a favorite in the late betting. McGovern seemed to dominate from the sixth round on, using frequent straight, short-arm punches into Dixon's body and face.  He eventually scored a knock down. The bout was ended when Dixon's manager threw in the sponge ending the match. The great lightweight Charlie White was in McGovern's corner for the bout. Some controversy existed among bettors when the officials ruled the fight a knockout when it technically was not, as no ten count was completed against Dixon. A betting controversy was inevitable, as one source wrote that the Dixon fight was "one of the heaviest betting bouts ever staged in America".

Defenses of Feather Title
On June 12, 1900, McGovern defeated Tommy White at the Seaside Sporting Club in a decisive third-round knockout in Brooklyn, New York. After two minutes of fighting in the first round, the electric lighting in the club went out, nearly causing a panic among the crowd. Ten minutes later the lights went on again and the fighting resumed. An attendant fan, Frank Conlin, kept the crowd sedate by whistling a series of tunes. White was seriously outclassed in the battle, as he was knocked down once in the first round, twice in the second, and four times in the third. McGovern made no objection to White being 1/2 pound overweight at weigh in. Referee Johnny White did a full ten count against White in the third round to end the bout.

On November 2, 1900, McGovern defeated the great New York Jewish featherweight Joe Bernstein in Louisville, Kentucky, in a World Featherweight Title fight. The bout ended in a seventh-round knockout. Bernstein was said to have "made a poor showing from the beginning." The fight was stopped by the referee George Siler when Bernstein could not rise in the eight round, after more than one knockdown, and a full eight count.

McGovern scored a knockout over the legendary Black boxer Joe Gans in a non-title match on December 13, 1900. Gans claimed that he threw the fight.  The issue of whether Gans had quit early and intentionally ended the fight was put to a Chicago District Attorney.  Both fighters had warrants issued for their arrest for disturbing the peace which were thrown out the day after the fight.

On April 30, 1901, before a crowd of 8,000, McGovern defeated Oscar Gardiner at the Mechanics Pavilion in San Francisco in a fourth-round knockout. They fought for a purse of $5,000 with the winner taking 75 percent. In the fourth round, Gardiner was knocked down three times before losing to a ten count after a blow to the stomach. Gardiner took a while to recover from the blows of McGovern after the count, and it was feared he was hurt seriously.

In another defense of his World Featherweight Title, McGovern was credited with knocking out Aurelio Herrera in five rounds. Herrera afterwards claimed he had been doped during the fight.

Loss of Feather Title, 1901

McGovern lost his World Featherweight Crown when he was stopped by Young Corbett II in two rounds on November 28, 1901. Corbett also won their rematch. Of their March 31, 1903, rematch in San Francisco, Young Corbett was said to have the best of the last three rounds of the 11th-round knockout.  McGovern had only a slight lead in the first eight rounds, as well as only a slight lead in the early betting.

On March 14, 1906, McGovern lost a lightweight match to Battling Nelson at the National Athletic Club in Philadelphia in a six-round newspaper decision. The fight was described as "one of the fastest and most vicious battles ever seen in the ring." In both the fourth and fifth rounds Nelson staggered McGovern with heavy lefts to the neck and jaw. Although McGovern landed repeatedly on Nelson, his blows did not slow the assault of his opponent. He did not appear to gain an advantage until the sixth round when he became the aggressor.  The bout could not have a referee ruling on points, but the Minneapolis Journal and four local Philadelphia newspapers gave Nelson the advantage.

McGovern finished his career with a record of 65 wins (42 KOs) 5 losses and 5 draws. As was common in that era, he also engaged in many No Decision bouts. In 2003, McGovern was named to the Ring Magazines list of 100 greatest punchers of all time. Boxing historian Nat Fleischer ranked McGovern as the greatest featherweight of all time. He had an estimated lifetime earnings of $203,000, which included his income as a vaudeville entertainer.

Life after boxing 

Like many boxers, McGovern lost some of his fortune betting on horses at the track before his retirement from boxing. He purchased a race horse and attempted to have one of his brothers ride as a jockey. He showed increasingly poor judgement in his betting as he slipped into mental illness.

McGovern spent much of his later life in mental institutions, though he was able to intermittently work odd jobs. He was working as a ticket taker at the Grand Opera House in Brooklyn near the end of his life.  Two months prior to his death he was visiting Camp Upton, a WW I military port of embarkation on Long Island when he took ill.   He died of pneumonia and Bright's disease, a kidney ailment in the charity ward of King's County Hospital, Brooklyn, New York, on February 22, 1918, at the age of 37. He died relatively poor, considering his lifetime earnings. In his final years, he lived on a pension given to him by his manager and promoter Sam Harris. Harris had been managing some of McGovern's remaining wealth as a trust fund, and was able to give a complete estate of $10,000 to McGovern's widow, which included the home they had been living in when McGovern died. Harris looked after McGovern in his waning years, as did his friend Joe Humphries. McGovern was married and left one son, Joe, of 19 years, and had two surviving brothers, Philip and Hugh. His final service was at the Church of St. John the Evangelist, and he was subsequently buried at Holy Cross Cemetery in Brooklyn.

Professional boxing record
All information in this section is derived from BoxRec, unless otherwise stated.

Official record

All newspaper decisions are officially regarded as “no decision” bouts and are not counted in the win/loss/draw column.

Unofficial record

Record with the inclusion of newspaper decisions in the win/loss/draw column.

See also
List of bantamweight boxing champions

References

External links 

 
 Terry McGovern - CBZ Profile
 Terry McGovern at Find a Grave

1880 births
1918 deaths
Bantamweight boxers
Irish male boxers
Featherweight boxers
World bantamweight boxing champions
World featherweight boxing champions
Vaudeville performers
American people of Irish descent
Deaths from pneumonia in New York (state)
Deaths from nephritis